Otobius is a genus in the soft-bodied tick family, Argasidae. While similar to the genus Ornithodoros it is characterized by a vestigial hypostome in adults, despite being developed in nymphs, in addition to the absence of both eyes and hood.

Species
Three species of Otobius are recognized.
Otobius lagophilus Cooley & Kohls, 1940
Otobius megnini Dugès, 1883
Otobius sparnus Kohls & Clifford, 1963

References 

Acari genera
Argasidae